Golf was contested at the 2011 Summer Universiade from 17–20 August at the Mission Hills Golf Club in Shenzhen, China. Men's and women's individual and team events were held.

Medal summary

Medal table

Events

References

2011 in golf
2011 Summer Universiade events
Golf at the Summer Universiade